Professor Chelvanayakam Kanaganayakam (May 7, 1952 – November 22, 2014) was a Tamil Canadian translator, author and academic.

Early life and family
Kanaganayakam was born on May 7, 1952 in Colombo, Ceylon. He was the son of V. Chelvanayakam, head of the Department of Tamil at the University of Ceylon, Peradeniya, and Kamalambikai. He was educated at Trinity College, Kandy. After school Kanaganayakam joined the University of Sri Lanka Peradeniya campus but following Osmund Jayaratne's "re-organisation" of universities, he and other  language and literature students were moved to the university's campus in Kelaniya. He graduated in 1976 with a B.A. degree in  English language and literature.

Kanaganayakam was married to Thirumagal. They had a daughter (Shankary) and a son (Jegan).

Career
Kanaganayakam was a lecturer in the Department of English at the University of Jaffna before joining the University of British Columbia on a Commonwealth scholarship, receiving a Ph.D. degree in 1985 after producing a thesis, supervised by W. H. New, on the writings of Zulfikar Ghose. Kanaganayakam joined the University of Toronto's Department of English in 1989 to research and teach Commonwealth literature. Appointed a professor in 2002, he went on to become director of the Centre for South Asian Studies at the Munk School of Global Affairs and co-ordinator of the independent studies program at Trinity College, Toronto.

Kanaganayakam was a founding member of the Tamil Literary Garden and the Toronto Tamil Studies Conference. On the morning of November 22, 2014 Kanaganayakam was inducted to the Royal Society of Canada as a fellow in Quebec City. That evening, as he went to a celebratory dinner in Montreal, he suffered a heart attack and died.

Works
Kanaganayakam wrote, translated and edited several books:
 Structures of Negation: The Writings of Zulfikar Ghose (1993, University of Toronto Press)
 Configuartions of Exile: South Asian Writers and Their World (1995, TSAR Publications)
 Dark Antonyms and Paradise: The Poetry of Rienzi Crusz (1997, TSAR Publications)
 Lutesong and Lament: Tamil Writing from Sri Lanka (2001, TSAR Publications, editor)
 Counterrealism and Indo-Anglian Fiction (2002, Wilfrid Laurier University Press)
 Moveable Margins: The Shifting Spaces of Canadian Literature (2005, TSAR Publications, editor)
 History and Imagination: Tamil Culture in the Global Context (2007, co-editors R. Cheran & Darshan Ambalavanar)
 New Demarcations: Essays in Tamil Studies (2009, Brown Bear Press, co-editors R. Cheran & Darshan Ambalavanar)
 Wilting Laughter: Three Tamil Poets (2009, translator)
 Nedunalvaadai (2010)
 You Cannot Turn Away (2010, translator)
 Ritual (2011, translator)
 World Without Walls: Being Human, Being Tamil (2011, co-editor)
 In Our Translated World: Contemporary Global Tamil Poetry (2013, TSAR Publications, editor)
 A History of South Asian Writing in English (2014, Cambridge University Press)
 Uprooting the Pumpkin: Selections from Sri Lankan Tamil Literature, 1950-2012 (2016, Oxford University Press, editor)

References

1952 births
2014 deaths
Academic staff of the University of Jaffna
Academic staff of the University of Sri Lanka (Jaffna)
Alumni of Trinity College, Kandy
Alumni of the University of Sri Lanka (Peradeniya)
Canadian people of Sri Lankan Tamil descent
Fellows of the Royal Society of Canada
Sri Lankan Tamil academics
Sri Lankan Tamil writers
University of British Columbia alumni
Academic staff of the University of Toronto